Abacetus planulus is a species of ground beetle in the subfamily Pterostichinae. It was described by Straneo in 1940.

References

planulus
Beetles described in 1940